Maria Andreae (1550–1632), was a German pharmacist.

In 1606, she was appointed Pharmacist of the Württemberg court by the duchess of Württemberg, Sibylla of Anhalt in succession to Helena Magenbuch. This was a very uncommon position for a woman in this time period.

References

1550 births
1632 deaths
16th-century women scientists
17th-century German businesswomen
17th-century German businesspeople
17th-century women scientists
German women scientists
Women pharmacologists
Women chemists
16th-century German businesswomen
16th-century German scientists
17th-century German scientists